Molki Subregion is a subregion in the Gash-Barka region (Zoba Gash-Barka) of western Eritrea. Its capital lies at Molki.

References
Awate.com: Martyr Statistics

Subregions of Eritrea